Wang Chung may refer to:

Wang Chung (band), an English new wave band
Wang Chong (27–97 AD), or Wang Ch'ung in Wade–Giles, a Han dynasty Chinese philosopher
Wang Zhong (Three Kingdoms) (died 242), or Wang Chung in Wade–Giles, general of the Cao Wei state in the Three Kingdoms period
Wang Zhong (Ming dynasty) (1359–1409), a marquis
Wang Zhong (Qing dynasty) (1745–1794), a Confucian scholar

See also
Wang Zhong (disambiguation)